H.A.M.M.E.R. is a fictional espionage and law enforcement agency appearing in American comic books published by Marvel Comics. The organisation is led by Norman Osborn and was formed in Secret Invasion #8 to replace S.H.I.E.L.D. The organisation plays a large part in Marvel's "Dark Reign" and Siege storylines that ran from 2008 to 2010.

What "H.A.M.M.E.R." stands for, or whether it stands for anything at all, has not been revealed. In Dark Avengers #1, Osborn told Victoria Hand that it does stand for something, but when she asked what it stands for, he told her to "get on that for [him]". Also, in the Captain America: Reborn Prelude, when Sin, who is captured by H.A.M.M.E.R, asks what it stands for, the agent present claims that it's classified information which she does not have the necessary security clearance to divulge.

Publication history
H.A.M.M.E.R. first appeared in Secret Invasion #8 and was created by Brian Michael Bendis.

Fictional organization history
The ramifications of the alien Skrulls' invasion of Earth forced a massive restructuring of the United States' defense network. At the time, the country's primary peace keeping agency was S.H.I.E.L.D., led by civilian industrialist Tony Stark, aka, Iron Man. Because the Skrulls were able to compromise S.H.I.E.L.D.'s StarkTech technology, it was decided that S.H.I.E.L.D. was no longer an effective organization and Tony Stark was personally held accountable for the entire Skrull invasion. In the wake of this controversy, Thunderbolts leader Norman Osborn manipulated the U.S. government into allowing him to serve as director of a replacement agency called H.A.M.M.E.R. Under Osborn's leadership, H.A.M.M.E.R. had administrative control over the entire Fifty State Initiative.

As the director of H.A.M.M.E.R., one of Osborn's first initiatives was to issue warrants for the arrest of former S.H.I.E.L.D. director Tony Stark and deputy director Maria Hill. Moreover, Osborn wanted access to the database containing the identities of every hero registered under the Superhuman Registration Act. To prevent Osborn from getting his hands on such vital information, Tony Stark took measures to erase all known resources containing this sensitive information, including his own mind.

When Stark failed to surrender himself to Osborn, Norman sent contingents of H.A.M.M.E.R. squads to Stark Industries facilities all across the globe with orders to arrest Tony Stark with extreme prejudice. The militant agents caused substantial damage in their efforts to find Stark, often brutalizing Stark Industries' personnel.

In an effort to make H.A.M.M.E.R.'s image more palatable to the general public, Osborn reorganized the Avengers, filling their ranks with members of the Thunderbolts. Two previous members of the team who remained on Osborn's Avengers were the Sentry and Ares, the God of War. Osborn himself donned his own suit of armor (based upon Stark's designs) and became known as the Iron Patriot.

During the Siege of Asgard, Osborn takes H.A.M.M.E.R. alongside the Dark Avengers and the Initiative members who are on his side to partake in the attack on Asgard. The President is watching the invasion of Asgard with his security council and orders the Secretary of State to mobilize all available military forces to be dispatched to Broxton and to have Osborn and the Dark Avengers arrested for treason. He also says that they should all pray for a miracle, to which one of the council members remarks that he thinks they just got one because Captain America has just arrived and brought his friends with him. The President then decides to let Captain America deal with Osborn and sends an order to the arriving military forces to deal with H.A.M.M.E.R. as the military shoots down one of the H.A.M.M.E.R. Helicarriers.

H.A.M.M.E.R. is soon officially dissolved. Some remnants of the organization attempt to reorganize themselves after Osborn's defeat and contact Victoria Hand to lead them, only to have her give their location to the New Avengers in her new role as their S.H.I.E.L.D. liaison. H.A.M.M.E.R. is soon reassembled by Superia. The New Avengers captured Superia after getting a tip from Victoria Hand.

Following the Fear Itself storyline, Osborn escapes from the Raft and even springs Superia out as well. Osborn reclaims control of H.A.M.M.E.R. and gains Madame Hydra, Gorgon, and some A.I.M. Agents as new members. H.A.M.M.E.R. later ends up in an alliance with A.I.M. and HYDRA. When Norman Osborn was defeated, H.A.M.M.E.R. ends up disbanding with Madame Hydra using the remaining members to reinforce HYDRA.

Later, members of H.A.M.M.E.R. along with S.H.I.E.L.D., S.T.R.I.K.E., Alpha Flight and other organizations established the group called Orchis, and began building cosmic level Sentinels in an orbital base, to take on mutantkind after Professor Xavier turned Krakoa into a sovereign nation state for mutants and used its unique abilities to created massive plantlike "Habitats" with embassies around the world, and through the combination of technology and mutant power, developed three drugs that could change human life – a pill that extends human life by five years, an adaptable universal antibiotic, and a pill that cures “diseases of the mind, in humans.” In exchange for recognizing the sovereignty of Krakoa, Professor X will give these drugs to mankind, with mutants living in peace on the island.

Known members
 Norman Osborn - The first Director of H.A.M.M.E.R.
 Victoria Hand - Deputy Director of H.A.M.M.E.R. Later becomes a liaison to the New Avengers.
 Deidre Wentworth - New Director of H.A.M.M.E.R. after the incarceration of Norman Osborn.

Agents

 Agent 345 - Member of H.A.M.M.E.R.
 Agent 3465 - Member of H.A.M.M.E.R.
 Agent 3534 - Member of H.A.M.M.E.R.
 Agent Abrams - Member of H.A.M.M.E.R. Killed by Venom (Mac Gargan).
 Agent Bernard - Member of H.A.M.M.E.R.
 Agent Bullock - Member of H.A.M.M.E.R.
 Agent Carr - Member of H.A.M.M.E.R.
 Agent Derek Young - Member of H.A.M.M.E.R.
 Agent Gertrude Jacks - Member of H.A.M.M.E.R.
 Agent Walsh - Member of H.A.M.M.E.R.
 Agent Young - A Hulked-Out HYDRA Agent that works for H.A.M.M.E.R.
 Alisandra Morales - Former member of S.H.I.E.L.D. She later becomes a member of H.A.M.M.E.R.
 Alvin Murphy - Member of H.A.M.M.E.R.
 American Eagle - Temporarily deputized by Norman Osborn.
 Collins - Member of H.A.M.M.E.R.
 Cross - Member of H.A.M.M.E.R.
 Derek Richardson - A H.A.M.M.E.R. Guard. Killed by Eric Koenig.
 Dr. Carolina Washington - Formerly a S.H.I.E.L.D. criminalist.
 Gorgon - He became the second Wolverine of Norman Osborn's second incarnation of the Dark Avengers.
 Jaken - Member of H.A.M.M.E.R.
 Jebediah Young - Member of H.A.M.M.E.R.
 Legend One - An insectoid agent who is a member of H.A.M.M.E.R.
 Madame Hydra - 
 Mick - Member of H.A.M.M.E.R.
 O'Reilly - Member of H.A.M.M.E.R.
 Viola Reichardt - Member of H.A.M.M.E.R.
 Violet - Member of H.A.M.M.E.R.

References

External links
 H.A.M.M.E.R. at Marvel Wiki

Fictional organizations
Characters created by Brian Michael Bendis
Marvel Comics supervillain teams
Fictional organizations in Marvel Comics